is a Japanese manga artist born in Fukuoka (which became Kamifukuoka in 1972 and then Fujimino in 2005), Saitama Prefecture, Japan, though she grew up in Mibu, Shimotsuga, Tochigi Prefecture. Hiiragi currently resides in Hakodate, Hokkaidō. Hiiragi made her manga debut with Cobalt Blue no Hitoshizuku in the manga magazine Ribon Original in 1984. Many consider stories such as Hoshi no Hitomi no Silhouette and Gin'iro no Harmony to be her masterpieces. However, she is known for her Whisper of the Heart manga, which was made into an anime film by Studio Ghibli. Baron, Neko no Danshaku, was also animated by Studio Ghibli and released as The Cat Returns. While a sequel of sorts, it is not a continuation of the story found in Whisper.

Bibliography

Manga

Series
Gin'iro no Harmony (Ribon, 1990–1992)
Hoshi no Hitomi no Silhouette (Ribon, 1985–1989)
Hoshi no Hitomi no Silhouette Bangaihen
Oinari-san Dai Panic (Ribon, 1988)
Engage (Ribon Original, 1991)
Engage II
Kono Machi de Kimi ni  (Margaret, 2002)"Okaa-san" no JikanPeppermint Graffiti (Ribon Original, 1994)Mimi wo Sumaseba (Ribon, 1989)Mimi wo Sumaseba: Shiawase na Jikan (Ribon Original, 1995)Smile! (Margaret, 1998)Step (Ribon, 1993)Yuki no Sakura no Ki no Shita de... (Bouquet, 1997)Yume no Machi: Neko no Danshaku (Margaret, 2002)

One-shotsCampus SketchCobalt Blue no Hitoshizuku (her debut work)Harukaze no MelodyHajimemashiteJoshikō no OkiteKikyou no Saku GoroKisetsu no ShioriKono Machi de Anata niKono Machi de Issho niKono Machi de Kimi niMahō no Toketa PrincessNaimono NedariNaimono Nedari 2Otome Gokoro·Yume GokoroShōjo ShōkeiSpring!Yuki no Sakura no Ki no Shita de...Yume no Kaori no Tea TimeCommissioned works
 The Cat Returns (2002)

Art booksSora no Eki (2002)

Image albumHoshi no Hitomi no Silhouette Image album'' (Warner/Pioneer, 1987)

References

External links
 

1962 births
Living people
Manga artists
Women manga artists
Japanese female comics artists
Female comics writers
20th-century Japanese women writers
21st-century Japanese women writers